Zbigniew "Ziggy" Niszczot (born 1 September 1955) is an Australian former professional rugby league footballer who played in the 1980s. He played for the South Sydney Rabbitohs in the New South Wales Rugby League premiership.

Playing career
Originally from Maitland, New South Wales, Niszczot played for North Newcastle before signing with South Sydney in 1980. Niszczot captained the Rabbitohs in the early 1980s.

Niszczot was selected for New South Wales for Games I and II of the 1982 State of Origin series against Queensland, scoring two tries in Game I to inspire a 20–16 win at Lang Park.

Footnotes

Sources
Andrews, Malcolm. The ABC of Rugby League. Australia: ABC Books, 2006.

External links
Ziggy Niszczot at NRL Stats

1955 births
Living people
Australian people of Hungarian descent
Australian rugby league players
Maitland Pickers players
Nelson Bay Blues players
New South Wales Rugby League State of Origin players
Rugby league centres
Rugby league players from Maitland, New South Wales
Rugby league wingers
South Sydney Rabbitohs captains
South Sydney Rabbitohs players